Empress Zhu may refer to:

Empress Zhu (Eastern Wu) (died 265), wife of the Eastern Wu emperor Sun Xiu during the Three Kingdoms period
Zhu Manyue (547–586), empress of the Chinese/Xianbei empire Northern Zhou
Empress Zhu (Liu Shouguang's wife) (died 914), wife of Liu Shouguang of the Chinese Five Dynasties and Ten Kingdoms state Yan
Empress Zhu (Song dynasty) (1102–1127), wife of Emperor Qinzong of Song

Zhu